The Váh is the longest river within Slovakia. Towns on the river include Liptovský Hrádok, Liptovský Mikuláš, Ružomberok, Vrútky, Žilina, Bytča, Považská Bystrica, Púchov, Ilava, Dubnica nad Váhom, Nemšová, Trenčín, Nové Mesto nad Váhom, Piešťany, Hlohovec, Sereď, Šaľa, Kolárovo and Komárno.

Etymology
The name is of Germanic or Slavic origin. It could be derived from old Germanic wȃg (stream) or proto-Slavic vagъ, vaga (pole, stick, carved branch) referring to reinforced riverbanks. Several Slavic river names with a similar motivation exist, but pre-Slavic origin of larger rivers in Slovakia is assumed in general. The earliest mentions are flumen Vvaga (1111) and aqua Vvac''' (1113).

Geography
Its two sources, the Biely Váh (White Váh) and the Čierny Váh'' (Black Váh), are located in the Vysoké Tatry (High Tatras) and Nízke Tatry (Low Tatra) mountains, respectively, and it flows over northern and western Slovakia and finally feeds into the Danube near Komárno. The left tributaries are Demänovka, Revúca, Ľubochnianka, Turiec, Rajčanka and Nitra rivers, and the right tributaries are Belá, Orava, Varínka, Kysuca, Biela voda, Vlára, Dubová, Dudváh and Malý Dunaj rivers. In late medieval time it was a property of Stibor of Stiboricz and his son Stibor of Beckov of the Clan of Ostoja, later passing to Maurice Benyovszky as a gift of Maria Theresa.

It includes canals, artificial dams (Čierny Váh, Liptovská Mara, Bešeňová, Krpeľany, Žilina, Hričov, Nosice, Sĺňava, Madunice, Kráľová and Selice) and 16 hydropower stations, whose construction started in the 1930s and increased after World War II. The main Slovak limited-access motorway is along the Váh (Bratislava – Trenčín – Považská Bystrica – Žilina and Ružomberok – Poprad), as well as the main railway Bratislava – Žilina – Košice.

References

Sources
Rural Development Programme of the SR 2007-2013

External links

Rivers of Slovakia
Tributaries of the Danube